Founded in 1931, Caiçaras Club is a private leisure club in Rio de Janeiro, Brazil. Located on an island of 33,000 m2 in Lagoa Rodrigo de Freitas, the club held the Pan American Games Rio 2007 Water Ski competitions.

External links 
Caiçaras Club Website

Sports venues in Rio de Janeiro (city)
Venues of the 2007 Pan American Games